Katrine Conroy  ( Thor-Larsen; born 1957 or 1958) is a Canadian politician who was elected to the Legislative Assembly of British Columbia in the 2005 provincial election. She represents the electoral district of Kootenay West as a member of the British Columbia New Democratic Party (BC NDP). She has served in the cabinet of British Columbia since 2017, currently as Minister of Finance.

Background
Conroy was born to Ben and Ingeborg Thor-Larsen, who were Danish immigrants to Canada. The family settled in the West Kootenays in 1962, with Katrine graduating from Castlegar's Stanley Humphries Secondary School in 1975, before finding work as a power engineer at the local pulp mill. She completed the early childhood education program at Selkirk College, then worked at local daycares before eventually becoming executive director of the Kootenay Columbia Childcare Society. In 1997 she returned to Selkirk College as a part-time instructor.

She was married to Ed Conroy, a former Member of the Legislative Assembly (MLA) for the district of Rossland-Trail, from March 1981 until his death on June 26, 2020, at the age of 73. She has 4 children.

Political career
Conroy ran as the NDP candidate for the riding of West Kootenay-Boundary in the 2005 provincial election, winning the seat by 7,138 votes. She was subsequently named caucus whip for the NDP in June 2005. In the 2009 election she ran in the riding of Kootenay West, winning by a margin of 8,054 votes; she was re-elected in that riding in the 2013, 2017 and 2020 elections. While the NDP was in opposition, Conroy served as critic in several portfolios, including Seniors, Interior Economic Development, and Labour.

Following NDP leader Carole James's dismissal of MLA Bob Simpson from party caucus, Conroy resigned from her position as opposition caucus whip on November 19, 2010. 

With the NDP coming to power as a minority government following the 2017 election, Conroy was appointed Minister of Children and Family Development under Premier John Horgan. Following her re-election in 2020, she was appointed Minister of Forests in the Horgan ministry. On December 7, 2022 she was appointed Minister of Finance by Premier David Eby.

Electoral record

References

External links

 Katrine Conroy

British Columbia New Democratic Party MLAs
Canadian ranchers
Female finance ministers
Women government ministers of Canada
Year of birth missing (living people)
Living people
Members of the Executive Council of British Columbia
Canadian people of Danish descent
Women MLAs in British Columbia
21st-century Canadian politicians
21st-century Canadian women politicians
Spouses of Canadian politicians